Jafarabad (also Romanized as Ja‘farābād) is a village in Roshtkhar Rural District, in the Central District of Roshtkhar County, Razavi Khorasan Province, Iran. At the 2006 census, its population was 34, in 8 families.

References 

Populated places in Roshtkhar County